The universal embedding theorem, or Krasner–Kaloujnine universal embedding theorem, is a theorem from the mathematical discipline of group theory first published in 1951 by Marc Krasner and Lev Kaluznin.

Statement

Proof
This proof comes from Dixon–Mortimer.

We now prove that this is a homomorphism.

so  Hence  is a homomorphism as required. 

The homomorphism is injective. Finally,  precisely when  in other words when  (as ).

Generalizations and related results
The Krohn–Rhodes theorem is a statement similar to the universal embedding theorem, but for semigroups. A semigroup  is a divisor of a semigroup  if it is the image of a subsemigroup of  under a homomorphism. The theorem states that every finite semigroup  is a divisor of a finite alternating wreath product of finite simple groups (each of which is a divisor of ) and finite aperiodic semigroups.
An alternate version of the theorem exists which requires only a group  and a subgroup  (not necessarily normal). In this case,  is isomorphic to a subgroup of the regular wreath product

References

Bibliography
 
 
 

Theorems in group theory